The 2004 Vermont gubernatorial election took place November 2, 2004 for the post of Governor of Vermont. Incumbent Republican Governor Jim Douglas was re-elected. Douglas defeated Peter Clavelle, the Progressive Mayor of Burlington who ran as a Democrat.

Democratic primary

Candidates
 Peter Clavelle, Mayor of Burlington, switched party affiliation from Progressive to Democratic to run in this election, and was cross-nominated by the Progressive Party.

Results

Republican primary

Candidates
 Jim Douglas, incumbent Governor of Vermont

Results

General election

Campaign
Clavelle attempted to link Douglas and President George W. Bush with bumper stickers saying "Jim = George". Douglas countered this by a willingness to criticize the national Republican Party, such as over the Bush administration's environmental policies.

The two main candidates faced each other in 18 debates during the campaign.

Predictions

Election results

See also
 2004 United States presidential election in Vermont
 2004 United States Senate election in Vermont
 2004 United States House of Representatives election in Vermont

Notes

References

External links
Jim Douglas campaign site

Governor
Vermont
2004